High Risk is an American reality television series hosted by Wayne Rogers that premiered on CBS on October 4, 1988. The series features high-risk stunts and jobs such as United States Border Patrol agents, automobile repossessors, cave explorers, and roller coaster testers. The show was quickly put together to fill time as a result of the 1988 Writers Guild of America strike. The series was canceled after five episodes.

Episodes
The show aired for four nights, with a different episode each night.

Episode 4 showcased the Border Crime prevention Unit, which consisted of five Border Patrol Agents and a Border Patrol Supervisor.  It also included five San Diego Police Officers and one San Diego Police Sergeant.  The team's objective was to patrol on foot in the hills of the border in search of bandits who preyed upon undocumented aliens entering the United States under cover of darkness. The show highlighted the conditions under which the team operated and the high number of assaults on undocumented aliens perpetrated by the bandits and the number of officer related shootings due to that inherent danger.

References

CBS original programming
1988 American television series debuts
1988 American television series endings